The Farr House is a historic house located at 106 E. Wynoka St. in Pierre, South Dakota. Built in 1904, the house was designed by architect E. J. Donahue in the Colonial Revival style. Donahue's design exhibits Georgian and Adamesque influences and features Ionic columns on the porch, two-story Ionic pilasters at the front corners, Palladian windows, and a dentillated cornice. The house's first owner, Colonel E. P. Farr, was a veteran and banker; his wife, Mary Noyes Farr, was one of the first female doctors in Pierre. Peter Norbeck later lived in the house during his term as South Dakota Governor, and Governor Carl Gunderson also lived in the house for a short time. The house is now a bed and breakfast.

The house was added to the National Register of Historic Places on December 4, 1980.

References

Houses on the National Register of Historic Places in South Dakota
Colonial Revival architecture in South Dakota
Houses completed in 1904
Houses in Pierre, South Dakota
National Register of Historic Places in Pierre, South Dakota